The Lothagam North Pillar Site, registered as GeJi9, is an archaeological site on the west side of Lake Turkana in Kenya dating to the Pastoral Neolithic. It is a communal cemetery, built between 3000 BCE and 2300 BCE by the region's earliest herders. It is thought to be eastern Africa's largest and earliest monumental cemetery. 

The main burial mound is flanked by megaliths, stone circles, and cairns and is believed to hold the remains of hundreds of individuals. Many of the people buried at Lothagam North were adorned with stone beads, ivory, animal teeth, rings or other ornaments.

Background 
The site is the oldest of six known pillar sites in the area and was in use for almost five hundred years.

It is hypothesized that towards the end of African humid period, nomadic peoples would return to the site to bury their dead. The changing climate caused the lake to recede revealing fertile land for herbivores to feed on. The use of the site ended with the end of the humid period. The change in the climate may have forced the local inhabitants to move elsewhere. 

Recent research published in the Journal of Anthropological Archaeology has argued that the cemetery was for all members of this community, not just the leaders. At the bottom of the mortuary cavity, pits with additional burials were carved into soft sandstone bedrock. Many burials were covered by sandstone slabs brought in from elsewhere. 

The cemetery was a planned and multi-generational project.

See also
 Kalokol Pillar Site
 Nabta Playa

References

External links

Archaeological sites in Kenya
Lake Turkana
Cemeteries in Kenya
Archaeological sites of Eastern Africa